Trentino
 Trentino-Alto Adige/Südtirol, an Italian region
 Trento, an Italian province
 Trentino Volley, a volleyball team from Trentino